Anthony Peacock (born 6 September 1985, in Middlesbrough) is an English footballer. Peacock was part of Middlesbrough's successful youth teams but was released in 2005 and signed for Darlington. He made 27 league appearances but was again released. He currently plays for Spennymoor Town in County Durham.

Honours
Middlesbrough
FA Youth Cup: 2003–04

References 

1985 births
Living people
Footballers from Middlesbrough
Association football midfielders
English footballers
Middlesbrough F.C. players
Darlington F.C. players
Blyth Spartans A.F.C. players
Spennymoor Town F.C. players
English Football League players